The term market liberalism is used in two distinct ways.

In the United States, the term is used as a synonym to classical liberalism. In this sense, market liberalism depicts a political ideology, combining a market economy with personal liberty and human rights in contrast to social liberalism which combines personal liberty and human rights along with a mixed economy and welfare state.

In Europe and elsewhere, the term market liberalism is often used as a synonym to economic liberalism, depicting a policy supporting the economic aspects of liberalism, without necessarily including the political aspects of liberalism.  In some political spheres, market liberalism refers to an economically liberal society that also provides a minimal to moderate-sized welfare state for its citizens.

See also 
 Classical liberalism
 Economic liberalism
 Laissez-faire
 Libertarianism in the United States
 Neoliberalism

References

Further reading
 

Liberalism
Classical liberalism
Libertarianism by form